Mohammadabad (also Romanized as Moḩammadābād; also known as Khartajal and Khar Ţajar) is a village in Chaharduli Rural District, in the Central District of Asadabad County, Hamadan Province, Iran. At the 2006 census, its population was 398, in 96 families.

References 

Populated places in Asadabad County